"You've Got the Touch" is a song written by Lisa Palas, John Jarrard and Will Robinson, and recorded by American country music band Alabama. The song, a ballad done in the band's signature mellow style, was released in December 1986, as the second and final single from the album The Touch.  "You've Got" the Touch was a number-one hit on the Billboard Hot Country Singles chart in April 1987.

The song was Alabama's 21st — and as it turned out, final consecutive — chart-topper in a string that dated from August 1980's "Tennessee River". The follow-up single, the semi-autobiographical "Tar Top," peaked at number seven that November, breaking the streak. A new streak would be started in early 1988 with the song "Face to Face".

This song is unrelated to Stan Bush's song of a similar title from the Transformers movie.

Charts

References

Works cited
Millard, Bob, "Country Music: 70 Years of America's Favorite Music," HarperCollins, New York, 1993
Roland, Tom, "The Billboard Book of Number One Country Hits," Billboard Books, Watson-Guptill Publications, New York, 1991

1987 singles
1986 songs
Alabama (American band) songs
Song recordings produced by Harold Shedd
RCA Records singles
Songs written by John Jarrard
Songs written by Will Robinson (songwriter)